Panikos Georgiou was the manager of ENTHOI Lakatamia FC. He is considered to be one of the best Cypriot managers of all time. He is best known for the two years he managed the Cyprus national football team and is remembered for the historical victory against Spain, 3-2. Panikos Georgiou is said to be "the manager of the first half".

References

Living people
Cypriot football managers
Cyprus national football team managers
1954 births
Panetolikos F.C. managers
Sportspeople from Nicosia